Amphobotrys ricini is a species of fungus in the family Sclerotiniaceae. It is a plant pathogen that causes disease on several species including gray mold blight on Euphorbia milii and poinsettia. Originally described as a species of Botrytis in 1949, it was transferred to the genus Amphobotrys in 1973.

References

Fungi described in 1949
Fungal plant pathogens and diseases
Sclerotiniaceae